CDK5 and ABL1 enzyme substrate 1 is a protein that in humans is encoded by the CABLES1 gene.

CABLES1 is a cyclin-dependent kinase (CDK)-binding protein that plays a role in proliferation and/or cell differentiation (Zukerberg et al., 2004).[supplied by OMIM]. It is a tumor suppressor gene which losing it (by mutations, knockout, knockdown or inactivation)  may lead to colorectal cancer CRC.

References

External links

Further reading